Gina Cavallaro is an American journalist and author who has covered the U.S. military in Iraq and Afghanistan.

Biography
Cavallaro's career in journalism began in San Juan, Puerto Rico, with WOSO, the island's only English-language radio station. She then became a reporter and editor at the English-language daily newspaper, The San Juan Star. After serving for one term as the press secretary for Rep. Carlos Romero Barcelo from Puerto Rico she went to work for the Army Times, which is owned by Gannett Company, as a deputy news editor in 2001 and became a full-time staff writer in 2002.

At Army Times, she covered U.S. military operations in Kuwait, Qatar, Jordan, Germany and dozens of Army posts in the United States. She embedded with the U.S. military in Afghanistan and Iraq several times. In 2005, she befriended 20-year-old Spc. Francisco Martinez in Iraq, who was assigned as her escort. He was later shot and killed on patrol by an enemy sniper. She witnessed his death and was traumatized by the loss. She later wrote of him in her book, Sniper: American Single-Shot Warriors in Iraq and Afghanistan.

She co-wrote Sniper with former Army Ranger Matt Larsen, whom she later married. The foreword is written by the 31st Vice Chief of Staff of the Army Gen. (Ret.) Richard A. Cody, architect of the Asymmetric Warfare Group and former commander of the 101st Airborne Division (Air Assault) and the 160th Special Operations Aviation Regiment. The book is a collection of stories and impressions from dozens of snipers – soldiers and marines, including Rangers and Special Forces Soldiers—who fought in Iraq and Afghanistan.

In 2010, Cavallaro became a senior writer at Marine Corps Times. She and Matt Larsen lived together in Zambia for a year before their marriage. She worked as a writer for the Millennium Challenge Corporation, a federal foreign aid agency, in the Congressional and Public Affairs office. In March 2017, Cavallaro became senior staff writer for ARMY magazine, a monthly publication of the Association of the U.S. Army.

References

External links
Military Reporters & Editors Biographies Archived

Year of birth missing (living people)
Living people
21st-century American women writers
American women war correspondents
Puerto Rican journalists
American newspaper journalists
American women journalists
Women in the Iraq War
21st-century American non-fiction writers